Hydro Tasmania, known for most of its history as the Hydro-Electric Commission (HEC) or The Hydro, is the trading name of the Hydro-Electric Corporation, a Tasmanian Government business enterprise which is the predominant electricity generator in the state of Tasmania, Australia. The Hydro was originally oriented towards hydro-electricity, due to Tasmania's dramatic topography and relatively high rainfall in the central and western parts of the state. Today Hydro Tasmania operates thirty hydro-electric and one gas power station, and is a joint owner in three wind farms.

The Minister for Energy, currently the Hon. Guy Barnett MP, has portfolio responsibility for Hydro Tasmania. Hydro Tasmania operates under the Government Business Enterprises (GBE) Act 1995 and the Hydro-Electric Corporation Act 1995, and has a reporting requirement to the Treasurer of Tasmania, currently the Hon. Michael Ferguson (Australian politician) MP. Hydro Tasmania was projected to pay the Tasmania Government a dividend of 42 million in 2016.

History

Establishment 
In 1914, the State Government set up the Hydro-Electric Department (changed to the Hydro-Electric Commission in 1929) to complete the first HEC power station, the Waddamana Hydro-Electric Power Station. Prior to that two private hydro-electric stations had been opened the Launceston City Council's Duck Reach Power Station, opened 1895 on the South Esk River (it was one of the first hydro-electric power stations in the southern hemisphere. Reefton Power Station in New Zealand is the first municipal hydro-station, beginning operations in 1888) and the Mount Lyell Mining and Railway Company's Lake Margaret Power Station, opened  in 1914. These power stations were taken over by the HEC and Duck Reach was closed in 1955. Lake Margaret was closed in 2006, but after a multimillion-dollar refit was recommissioned in 2009.

Following the Second World War in the 1940s and early 1950s, many migrants came to Tasmania to work for the HEC with construction of dams and sub-stations. This was similar to the Snowy Mountains Scheme in New South Wales and similar effects in bringing in a significant number of people into the local community enriching the social fabric and culture of each state.  Most constructions in this era were concentrated in the centre of the island.

As the choice of rivers and catchments in the central highlands were exhausted, the planners and engineers began serious surveying of the rivers of the west and south west regions of the state.  The long term vision of those within the HEC and the politicians in support of the process, was for continued utilisation of all of the state's water resources.

As a consequence of such a vision, the politicians and HEC bureaucrats were able to create the upper Gordon river power development schemes despite worldwide dismay at the loss of the original Lake Pedder.  The hydro-industrialisation of Tasmania was seen as paramount above all, and the complaints from outsiders were treated with disdain.

Interrupted dam making 
Following the flooding of Lake Pedder by the HEC for the upper Gordon Power Development and the subsequent backlash against the HEC incursions into the south west wilderness of Tasmania, environmental groups of the 1970s and 80s alerted the rest of Australia to the continued power that the HEC had over the Tasmanian environment and politics.

Numbers of Tasmanian politicians either rose or fell on their alignment with the support of the HEC and its power development schemes in the south west and West Coast of Tasmania.

When the HEC proposed a dam on the Gordon River, sited below the Franklin River, there was widespread and vigorous opposition. During the Franklin River 'No Dams' campaign it was common for members of families to be in conflict with one another by being aligned with the HEC proposals or the Conservationists.

The Tasmanian Labor Government attempted to resolve the dispute by offering a compromise dam, sited on the Gordon River above the Olga River, which would have avoided flooding the Franklin River. However, almost no-one wanted this compromise. Conservationists were concerned that the Franklin River area and surrounding wilderness would be damaged, and those in favour of a dam preferred an option that would utilise the Franklin's water as well as the Gordon's water. 
  
The Tasmanian Government then offered a referendum on the issue, which only offered two choices: the Gordon below Franklin dam and the Gordon above Olga dam. There was widespread condemnation that the referendum did not offer a 3rd choice of not having any dam on the Gordon River, and various opinions were offered as to the best way of communicating this at the ballot box. As it turned out, of the 92% of eligible voters to attend the voting booths that day, 47% voted for the Gordon below Franklin option, with the remainder voting informally (45%) or for the Gordon above Olga option (8%). The conservationists were ultimately successful in their campaign to stop any dam on the Gordon River, and the proposal and early works on the Gordon-below-Franklin Dam ended in 1983 when it was blockaded by the environmentalists and the recently elected Liberal State Government lost a High Court challenge to the Commonwealth's powers. The new Hawke Labor Government in Canberra had opposed the Franklin dam and had moved to stop its construction.

The compromise between the State and Federal government and conservationists led the HEC to see the end of an over fifty year long dam making enterprise in the construction of the Henty River and King River power developments.

The limits reached 
The conservationists and the HEC in the 1980s acknowledged that there were a limited range of options for further power development schemes, and it was inevitable that the substantial workforce within the HEC specifically employed in the investigation and development of further dams would eventually become redundant.

Since the late 1990s HEC water storages have been progressively drawn down due to power demand exceeding long term supply, the overcoming of which was the original reason the Gordon-below-Franklin dam was proposed. The shortfall has been offset first by drawing down water storage and in latter years through increasing volumes of fossil fuel power generation, at first fuelled by oil and more recently by gas and, via the Basslink cable link to Victoria, coal.

From HEC to Hydro Tasmania 
In the early 1990s, eastern state governments prepared for the National Electricity Market (NEM) and electricity deregulation. In anticipation of Tasmania joining NEM, the Hydro-Electric Commission was broken up on 1 July 1998, creating three separate state-owned companies:

 Hydro Tasmania, the electricity generator. 
 Transend Networks, the electricity transmitter. Transend has since merged with Aurora's distribution arm to form TasNetworks.
 Aurora Energy, the electricity distributor and retailer, which sells and distributes electricity to customers.

Tasmania joined NEM in May 2005.

Starting from the 1990s, Hydro Tasmania has been investing in wind farms, the first one being the Huxley Hill Wind Farm on King Island, which was completed in 1998. This was followed by two wind farms at Woolnorth with a combined capacity of 140MW. Construction of a fourth power station, the Musselroe Wind Farm with a generating capacity of 168 MW was completed in 2013.

It was argued in support of the privatization of Hydro Tasmania that it would result in an increase in revenue and an improvement in company efficiency. The Liberals supported privatisation in the 1990s but failed to convince the public of its merits. They have now reversed this policy. The Labor Party and the Tasmanian Greens have never openly supported privatisation; however many speculate that the Labor Party will support this move in the future. Some evidence of this first arose in late 2003 when a Labor government allowed Hydro Tasmania to sell its subsidiary software business, Hydstra, to a German competitor and again in 2005 when it allowed the sale of part of its financial interests in wind farm company, Roaring 40s to a Hong Kong-based company CLP Power Asia. However, the present policy of all three major political parties is against privatisation, and community opinion mostly supports public ownership.

Hydro Tasmania in the 2000s saw the loss of the old dam building generation. The Anthony Power Development, was considered to be part of the last hydro-electric power development in Tasmania.  In 2008, the 1,000 GWH Project saw upgrades to parts of existing structures operated by the Hydro, and on-going progress towards being a carbon neutral operation. In 2020, Tasmania has an annual renewable electricity capacity of 10 TWh, equivalent to its average annual electricity consumption.

2016 crisis

In early 2016, as Tasmania was reaching the lowest water levels ever encountered, there was a fault in Basslink which led to the shutdown of the link to the mainland for about 6 months creating the 2016 power crisis. That plant had been mothballed and was to be sold when the crisis took place.

Power Stations

Gas (thermal)

Gas turbine

Hydroelectric

Wind farms

Key officeholders

Ministers
 The Hon. Sir John C McPhee (1930–1934)
 The Hon. Sir Walter Lee (1934)
 The Hon. T.H. Davies (1934–1942)
 The Hon. Sir Robert Cosgrove(1942–1958)
 The Hon. Eric Reece (1958)

See also 

 List of power stations in Tasmania

References

Further reading 
Hydro Tasmania publications
 Fenton, Heather (2008) Ticklebelly tales and other stories from the people of the Hydro, Hobart: Hydro Tasmania.  (hbk.)
 Garvie, R. M. H. (1962) A million horses: Tasmania's power in the mountains Hobart: Hydro-Electric Commission, Tasmania.
 Lupton, Roger. (1999) Lifeblood: Tasmania's Hydro Power Publisher: Edgecliff, N.S.W. Focus Publishing, noting (C) Hydro Tasmania and  pp. 428–430 Reviewers Biographies - 13 HEC staff and retired staff as reviewers of Luptons work - as a commissioned history
 Quirk, Marilyn. & Arts Tasmania. & Hydro Tasmania (2006), Echoes on the mountain: remarkable migrant stories from the hydro villages of the Tasmanian central highlands' Quirk. 'Heybridge, Tas.
 Scanlon, Andrew. (1995) Water power 2nd ed. [1st ed 1990] Hobart: Hydro-Electric Commission, Tasmania. 

Other publications
 Kellow, Aynsley J. (1996) Transforming power : the politics of electricity planning. Cambridge, UK; Cambridge University.  (hbk)   (pbk.)
 Thompson, Peter. (1981) Power in Tasmania'' Hawthorn, Vic: Australian Conservation Foundation.

External links
 http://www.hydro.com.au Hydro Tasmania
http://www.momentumenergy.com.au Momentum
 http://www.entura.com.au Entura
 https://web.archive.org/web/20060821115426/http://www.parks.tas.gov.au/wha/wherein/detail.html

Hydro-Tasmania
1914 establishments in Australia
1998 disestablishments in Australia
2016 Tasmanian energy crisis